Shivdulare was an Indian politician from the state of the Madhya Pradesh.
He represented the Bilaspur Vidhan Sabha constituency of the undivided Madhya Pradesh Legislative Assembly by winning General election of 1957.

References 

Year of birth missing
Possibly living people
Madhya Pradesh MLAs 1957–1962
People from Bilaspur, Chhattisgarh
Indian National Congress politicians from Madhya Pradesh